The Writers' Room is an American television talk show hosted by screenwriter and actor Jim Rash.  Each episode features a behind-the-scenes look at the writing staff of popular television series.  The series premiered on July 29, 2013.

Premise
Familiar with the process, Academy Award-winning screenwriter and veteran actor Jim Rash talks with the creators and head writers of critically acclaimed prime-time television shows to examine the aura in "the writers' room" and the writers' mental process through each episode.

Episodes

Season 1 (2013)

Season 2 (2014)

Awards

References

External links
 

2013 American television series debuts
2014 American television series endings
2010s American late-night television series
2010s American documentary television series
English-language television shows
Sundance TV original programming